"The Wedge" is a 1993 song by the American band Phish. It is the seventh track from their 1993 concept album Rift and was released as their fourth promotional single by Elektra Records. The song is a mid-tempo jazz fusion tune written by Phish guitarist and lead vocalist Trey Anastasio and lyricist Tom Marshall.

With a catchy sing-along chorus (which, in The Phish Book, Tom noted was inspired by Neil Young’s “Thrasher”) punctuated by an infectious beat and featuring some wonderful bass bombs, “The Wedge” was a longtime resident in a select group of songs: always requested but rarely played. Following its 1993 debut it roared out of the gates, but was on the shelf by the end of summer and was bypassed entirely in 1994. After its breakout in the summer of 1995 “The Wedge” was only played once in 1996 and twice in 1997 before coming back to rotation in 1998.

Track listing

"The Wedge" (Trey Anastasio, Tom Marshall) - 4:07

Personnel
Musicians
Trey Anastasio – guitars, vocals
Page McConnell – keyboards, vocals
Mike Gordon – bass guitar, vocals
Jon Fishman – drums, vocals

Also appears on
Hampton Comes Alive (1999)

Notes

1993 songs
Phish songs
Songs written by Trey Anastasio
Songs written by Tom Marshall (singer)
Song recordings produced by Barry Beckett
Elektra Records singles